Morus notabilis is a species of mulberry found in Yunnan and Sichuan provinces of China, at around  in elevation. It was first formally named by Camillo Karl Schneider in 1916.

It has 2n = 14 chromosomes, suggesting that it is basal to all the other species in its genus. Chromosome number ranges among species in the genus; for comparison, there are 28 in M. indica and 308 in M. nigra.

References

notabilis
Plants described in 1916
Trees of China